The 2014 Copa de la Reina de Fútbol was the 32nd edition of the Spanish women's football national cup. It ran from 18 May to 22 June 2014, and was contested by the best eight teams in the 2013–14 Spanish Championship. Both the quarterfinals and the semifinals were two-legged ties, while the final was held in Estadio Alfonso Murube, Ceuta.

Qualification

Top eight positions of the 2013-14 Spanish First Division.

Qualified teams by community

Results

Bracket

Quarterfinals

1st leg

2nd leg

Semifinals

1st leg

2nd leg

Final

Goalscorers
3 goals:

1 goal:

References

External links
Season on soccerway.com

Women
Copa de la Reina
Copa de la Reina de Fútbol seasons